Davudabad castle is a historical castle located in Anar County in Kerman Province, The longevity of this fortress dates back to the Safavid dynasty and Qajar dynasty.

References 

Castles in Iran
Qajar castles